Donald Iverson (born October 28, 1945) is an American professional golfer who played on the PGA Tour in the 1970s.

Iverson was born, raised and has lived most of his life in La Crosse, Wisconsin. He attended La Crosse Central High School, where he was a star quarterback on the football team and member of the golf team. He graduated in 1963. As an amateur, he won six La Crosse Tribune County Amateur Golf Championships from 1960–1967. He attended the University of Wisconsin–La Crosse graduating in 1968 with a Bachelor of Science degree in economics. He won the 1966 NAIA Championship. He turned professional later that year.

Iverson played nine years on the PGA Tour from 1971–1979.  The biggest win of his career came at the 1975 B.C. Open; he shot a final round 68 for a four-day total of 274 (10-under-par) to edge David Graham and Jim Colbert by one stroke. Iverson's best year on the Tour was also 1975, when in addition to his win at the B.C. Open, he tied for 37th on the money list with $56,559. His best finish in a major was T-6 at the 1973 PGA Championship where Iverson was a co-leader after both the first and second rounds.  

After retiring as a touring professional in 1979, he moved back home to La Crosse and went to work as a national sales representative for Inland Printing Company. In 1980, he was elected to the UW–La Crosse Hall of Fame. He was inducted into the Wisconsin State Golf Association Hall of Fame in 1988. Iverson and his wife, Virginia, have two children, Corie and Merritt.

Amateur wins
1960 Wisconsin Junior
1962 Wisconsin Junior
1963 International Jaycee Junior
1965 CVGA Tournament of Champions
1966 Wisconsin Amateur, NAIA Championship
1960–1967 six LaCrosse Tribune County Amateurs

Professional wins (3)

PGA Tour wins (1)

Other wins (2)
1972 Shreveport Open Classic
1977 Maine Open

See also 

 Fall 1968 PGA Tour Qualifying School graduates

References

External links

CVGA history

American male golfers
PGA Tour golfers
Golfers from Wisconsin
La Crosse Central High School alumni
Sportspeople from La Crosse, Wisconsin
1945 births
Living people